Validabad (also Romanized as Valīdābād and Walīdābād) is a village in Khosrow Beyk Rural District, Milajerd District, Komijan County, Markazi Province, Iran. At the 2006 census, its population was 120, in 27 families.

References 

Populated places in Komijan County